Not So Quiet on the Western Front is a 1930 British comedy film directed by Monty Banks and starring Leslie Fuller, Mona Goya and Wilfred Temple. It was made as a quota quickie by British International Pictures at Elstree Studios. Its title is a reference to All Quiet on the Western Front.

Cast
 Leslie Fuller as Bill Smith
 Mona Goya as Fifi
 Wilfred Temple as Bob
 Stella Browne as Yvonne
 Gladys Cruickshank as Mimi
 Gerald Lyle as Private Very
 Dmitri Vetter as Private John Willie
 Syd Courtenay as Lieutenant
 Frank Melroyd as Sergeant
 Marjorie Loring as Diane
 Nina Olivette as Dancer

References

Bibliography
 Chibnall, Steve. Quota Quickies: The Birth of the British 'B' Film. British Film Institute, 2007.
 Low, Rachael. Filmmaking in 1930s Britain. George Allen & Unwin, 1985.
 Wood, Linda. British Films, 1927-1939. British Film Institute, 1986.

External links
 

1930 films
Films shot at British International Pictures Studios
1930s English-language films
Films directed by Monty Banks
1930 comedy films
British comedy films
British black-and-white films
Quota quickies
1930s British films